Glay is the eleventh studio album by Japanese band Glay. The album was released on October 13, 2010. It reached #1 on the Oricon charts and Billboard Japan Top Albums chart and sold a total of 125,081 copies as of January 3, 2011. It is the first album released under the band's own label "Loversoul Music & Associates." The limited edition came with a DVD featuring a live at Niigata Lots on July 30, 2010 and the anime movie Je t'aime, which was directed by Oshii Mamoru, produced by Production I.G and featured "Satellite of Love" as the theme song.

The album is certified Gold by the RIAJ for shipment of over 100,000 copies.

Track listing

Standard Edition

Wasted Time

Apologize

Precious
Satellite of Love
Chelsea

Limited Edition

Bonus DVD track listing

References

External links
Official website

2010 albums
Glay albums